During the 1998–99 Croatian football season, Croatia Zagreb competed in the Prva HNL.

Season summary
Croatia Zagreb made their debut in the Champions League group stage, drawn against Olympiakos, Porto and Ajax. Zagreb failed to win any of their first three group games, resulting in the departure of manager Zlatko Kranjčar. His replacement, Velimir Zajec, inspired a turnaround and wins against Porto and Ajax gave the club hope of reaching the quarter-finals. A home draw with Olympiakos in the final group stage match saw Croatia Zagreb finish second in their group, but as they were the lowest-ranked of all the group stage runners-up they did not progress.

First-team squad
Squad at end of season

Left club during season

Results

Champions League

Second qualifying round
 Celtic 1-0 Croatia Zagreb
 Croatia Zagreb 3-0 Celtic

Group stage

References

GNK Dinamo Zagreb seasons
Croatia Zagreb
Croatian football championship-winning seasons